Tamra (or ) is an Arab city in the North District of Israel located in the Lower Galilee  north of the city of Shefa-Amr and approximately  east of Acre.

History
Tamra is an ancient village on a hill. Old squared stone blocks have been reused in village homes. Cisterns and tombs carved into rock have also been found here.

It has been suggested that Tamra is identical to Kefar Tamartha, a Jewish village mentioned in the Talmud as the home of 3rd century amora Rabbi Shila of Kefar Tamarta.

Crusader period
In the 1253, during the Crusader period, John Aleman, Lord of Caesarea, sold several villages, including Tamra, to the Hospitallers. In 1283 it was mentioned as part of the domain of the Crusaders, according to the hudna (temporary truce) between the Crusaders in Acre and the Mamluk sultan Qalawun.

Ottoman period
Tamra, was incorporated into the Ottoman Empire in 1517, and in the census of 1596 the village was located in the Nahiya of Acca, part of Safad Sanjak. The population was 22 Muslim households. They paid a fixed tax rate of 20% on wheat, barley, fruit trees, cotton, occasional revenues, beehives and winter pastures; a total of 2,929 akçe. In 1799 it was named Tomrat on the map of Pierre Jacotin.

In 1859 the British Consul Rogers estimated the population to be 1,200, all Muslims, and the cultivated area 80 feddans, while Victor Guérin found it in 1875 to have 800 inhabitants, all Muslim.

In 1881, the PEF's Survey of Western Palestine (SWP) described Tamra as: "A large village, with a small mosque on the east and well on the north. There is a rock-cut tomb west of the houses. South of the village, in the valley, a fine olive-grove extends as far as er Rueis."

A population list from about 1887 showed that Tamra had about 535 inhabitants, all Muslims.

British Mandate
At the time of the 1922 census of Palestine Tamra had a population of 1,111, all Muslims, increasing in the 1931 census to 1,258, all Muslims, in a total of 282 houses.

In the 1945 statistics, Tamra had 1,830 inhabitants, all Muslims, while the total jurisdiction of the village was 30,559 dunams of land. 1,564 dunams were used for plantations and irrigable land, 14,434 dunams for cereals, while 206 dunams were built-up (urban) land.

State of Israel
Tamra was captured by Israeli forces from the Arab Liberation Army and the Syrian Army in 1948 Arab–Israeli War as a part of Operation Dekel. On 20 May 1948 the civilian population had been evacuated on orders from Arab irregular forces. According to Benny Morris it was feared that the village would surrender to the Yishuv. The city grew rapidly in the period of Israel's first years as a nation due to the influx of Palestinian refugees from destroyed nearby villages such as al-Birwa or al-Damun. Large percentages of the city's farming land was expropriated by Israeli authorities and allocated to farming cooperatives and nearby Jewish settlement towns such as Mitzpe Aviv. Tamra achieved local council status in 1956 and was declared a city in 1996.

The city became famous for its large dairy factory named "Rajeb-Tamra", taking a certain portion of the dairy market in Israel, especially in the Arab sector.

Demographics
According to the Israel Central Bureau of Statistics (CBS), at the end of 2007 the city had a total population of 27,300. In 2001, the ethnic makeup of the city was almost entirely Arab (99.6% Muslim), with no significant Jewish population. See Population groups in Israel.

According to CBS, in 2001 there were 11,900 males and 11,400 females. The population of the city was spread out, with 48.5% 19 years of age or younger, 18.0% between 20 and 29, 19.7% between 30 and 44, 9.0% from 45 to 59, 1.6% from 60 to 64, and 3.0% 65 years of age or older. The population growth rate in 2001 was 3.3% and 2005 had dropped to 2.5%.

The largest and most influential clan in Tamra is the Diab, which consists of several branches. Other clans include the Hejazi, and the smaller clans of Abd al-Hadi, Abu Na'ama, Abu Rumi, Amar, Arshid, Awwad, Kanaan, Muhsin, Nasser, Natour, Ourabi, Radi, Shama, Shaqir, Sheikh Ali and Yassin. In addition to the aforementioned clans, whose presence in Tamra predates the state of Israel, the city is home to internally displaced Palestinians and their descendants from the nearby villages of al-Damun, Hadatha, Mi'ar and al-Ruways, which were depopulated during the 1948 Arab-Israeli war.

Income
According to CBS, as of 2000, in the city there were 3,908 salaried workers and 375 are self-employed. The mean monthly wage in 2000 for a salaried worker in the city is ILS 2,887, a real change of −2.2% over the course of 2000. Salaried males have a mean monthly wage of ILS 3,358 (no real change) versus ILS 1,977 for females (a real change of −7.6%). The mean income for the self-employed is 4,763. There are 445 people who receive unemployment benefits and 5,290 people who receive an income guarantee.

Education
According to CBS, there are 13 schools and 5,779 students in the city. They are spread out as 9 elementary schools and 4000 elementary school students, and 3 high schools and 2,324 high school students. 54.6% of 12th grade students were entitled to a matriculation certificate in 2001.

During the late 1990s sociologist As'ad Ghanem set up an NGO in Tamra. It was called Ibn Khaldun and campaigned for more Arab history to be taught in Israeli schools.

Sports
The current football teams in the city are Maccabi Tamra and F.C. Tzeirei Tamra, both play in Liga Gimel, the fifth tier of Israeli football. Maccabi Tamra and Hapoel Bnei Tamra (which is now defunct), played in the past in Liga Artzit, having been promoted from Liga Alef in 1988 and 2006 respectively.

Notable people
Mohammed Awaed (born 1997), football player for Maccabi Haifa
Yussef Diab (1917–1984), member of the Knesset

See also
Arab localities in Israel

References

Bibliography

External links
Official website 
Welcome To Tamra
Survey of Western Palestine, Map 5: IAA, Wikimedia commons 
Susan Nathan: An Israeli Jew in a Muslim town
Municipality of Tamra (Israel) Flags of the World
The Condition of the Palestinian Minority Exposed By New Book Reilly Vinall
"Combining Empathy with Problem Solving: The Tamra Model of Facilitation in Israel" by Eileen F. Babbitt and Pamela Pomerance Steiner, with Jabir Asaqla, Chassia Chomsky-Porat, and Shirli Kirschner, Chapter 8 of 'Building Peace: Practical Reflections from the Field'

 
Arab localities in Israel
1996 establishments in Israel
Cities in Northern District (Israel)